"Open Your Eyes" is a song written by Brian James and Stiv Bators of English/American rock band The Lords of the New Church, and released in July 1982 as the second single of their debut studio album The Lords of the New Church (1982).

The Lords of the New Church original
The song reached number 7 on the UK Indie Chart, and became the band's only single to chart on the Canadian charts peaking at number 34, and the US Mainstream Rock at number 27.

Weekly charts

David Hasselhoff version

Background
American actor and singer David Hasselhoff's version, was released on September 9, 2019 as the lead single from Hasselhoff's fourteenth studio album Open Your Eyes (2019). American guitarist and songwriter James Williamson also featured on the song. The music video was released the same day as the song's release, and was directed by Vicente Cordero. The music video shows Hasselhoff performing in front of a wall of TV's showcasing white noise-laden images and flash the word “lies”. Hasselhoff performed the song during his 2019 tour Freedom!: The Journey Continues, who took place in October 2019 in Germany, Austria and Switzerland.

References

1982 singles
1982 songs
British rock songs
American rock songs